South Africa competed at the 2022 World Games held in Birmingham, United States from 7 to 17 July 2022. Athletes representing South Africa won one gold medal and the country finished in 47th place in the medal table.

Medalists

Competitors
The following is the list of number of competitors in the Games.

Air sports

South Africa competed in air sports.

Archery

South Africa competed in archery.

Bowling

South Africa competed in bowling.

Canoe marathon

South Africa won one medal in canoe marathon.

Cue sports

South Africa competed in cue sports.

Duathlon

South Africa competed in duathlon.

Powerlifting

South Africa competed in powerlifting.

Rhythmic gymnastics

South Africa competed in rhythmic gymnastics.

Sport climbing

South Africa competed in sport climbing.

Water skiing

South Africa competed in water skiing.

References

Nations at the 2022 World Games
2022
World Games